Chinese unification or unification of China most commonly refers to the potential political unification of the People's Republic of China and the Republic of China into one sovereign state.

Chinese unification may also refer to:

Historical
 Qin's wars of unification, a series of wars that unified China proper in the late 3rd century BC
 Chu–Han Contention, 206–202 BC interregnum between the Qin dynasty and the Han dynasty
 Conquest of Wu by Jin, AD 280 campaign that reunified China proper under the Jin dynasty
 Transition from Sui to Tang, period (AD 613–628) between the end of the Sui and the start of the Tang dynasty which unified China proper
 Jurchen unification, a series of events in the transition from Ming to Qing dynasty that led to the unification of the Jurchen tribes under Nurhaci

Contemporary
 Northeast Flag Replacement, 1928 nominal unification of Manchuria with the rest of China under the Nationalist government 
 Handover of Hong Kong, 1997 return of Hong Kong to Chinese rule
 Transfer of sovereignty over Macau, 1999 return of Macau to Chinese rule

See also
 Song conquest of Northern Han, which unified most of China proper in 979
 Yuan conquest of China, which unified China under the Yuan dynasty
 Division of China (disambiguation)